Matti Yrjänä Joensuu (31 October 1948, in Helsinki, Finland – 4 December 2011, in Valkeakoski, Finland) was a Finnish writer of crime fiction. He has been awarded the State's Literature Prize (1982), Vuoden johtolanka prize (1985, 1994, 2004), and he has been nominated for two Finlandias. He received the Martin Beck Award in 1987.

Joensuu's Harjunpää stories have also been adapted for Film & TV. Joensuu's work has been translated into English, Bulgarian, Dutch, Italian, Norwegian, French, Swedish, German, Slovak, Danish, Hungarian, Armenian, Russian and Estonian.

The protagonist of Joensuu's novels, the senior constable Timo Harjunpää, is a sympathetic character who is equally human about the criminals he encounters in his work as his family. Joensuu also describes the world of thought of his people. The surname Harjunpää writer borrowed from 1966 from a deceased constable Reino Harjunpää.

Timo Harjunpää novels
Joensuu has written several novels about the personal life and work of policeman Timo Harjunpää. He is a very credible and pleasant man, who treats the criminals as humanely as his own family, which consists of Timo, his wife Elisa and three children (Valpuri, Pipsa and Pauliina). Another major character is Harjunpää's police partner Onerva Nykänen.

List of Harjunpää novels
Väkivallan virkamies (1976)
Possu ja paavin panttivangit (1977)
Harjunpää ja pyromaani (1978)
Harjunpää ja kapteeni Karhu (1981)
Harjunpää ja ahdistelija (1982) 
Harjunpää ja poliisin poika (1983) (Harjunpää and the Stone Murders, translated in English by Raili Taylor) 
Harjunpää ja heimolaiset (1984) 
Harjunpää ja rakkauden lait (1985)
Harjunpää ja kiusantekijät (1986)
Harjunpää ja rakkauden nälkä (1993) (To Steal Her Love, translated in English by David Hackston)
Harjunpää ja pahan pappi (2003) (The Priest of Evil, translated in English by David Hackston)
Harjunpää ja rautahuone (2010)

Harjunpää adaptations

References

1948 births
2011 deaths
Writers from Helsinki
Finnish crime writers
Finnish crime fiction writers